Survivor BG: Expedition Robinson was the second season of the Bulgarian reality television series of Survivor BG.

The season had 22 contestants competed in tribes facing off against each other in the Dominican Republic where they competed for rewards and immunity to avoid being eliminated themselves. After 52 days, the jury decided Georgi Kostadinov to win 250,000 leva and the title of Sole Survivor. 

The show officially started on 24 September 2007. However, on 19 September there was a special live show in which the 22 contestants took part. In this season, there were some celebrity contestants, such as Djina Stoeva and Svetla Dimitrova.

The series had a new host, the actor Vladimir Karamazov. The season premiered on 19 September 2007 on bTV. The season final was aired on 6 December 2007 on bTV with Georgi Kostadinov winning 250,000 leva and the title of Sole Survivor.

Contestants

See also

2007 Bulgarian television series endings
Bulgaria
2000s Bulgarian television series
2007 Bulgarian television seasons
Television shows filmed in the Dominican Republic